Sudie and Simpson is an American television film that originally aired on Lifetime on September 11, 1990. Directed by Joan Tewkesbury, the film stars Louis Gossett Jr. and Sara Gilbert.

Overview
Set in a small town in Georgia during World War II, Sudie and Simpson focuses on the friendship between Sudie Harrigan (Gilbert), a 10-year-old girl who had never seen a "nigger" in real life, and Simpson (Gossett Jr.), a black man living surreptitiously in an abandoned shack in the woods. Sudie who finds to her surprise and pleasure that black people are not all nine feet tall, that they know what they do, and that their skin color doesn't rub off. Moreover, the gentle, harmless and moral character of Simpson is contrasted with a white teacher who molests his students.

The themes of racism and morality are compared and contrasted, dramatically. If the whites, who "don't allow no niggers" in town, discover the presence of Simpson, they will likely expel him or lynch him. If the victims of the white child molester complain to their mothers, they fear getting "a whipping".

Reviews
People said, "Gossett towers over the cast of this sexually frank but lax melodrama."

References

External links
 
Sudie and Simpson at Hulu

1990 films
1990 drama films
1990 television films
American drama television films
Fictional duos
Films about racism
Films set in Georgia (U.S. state)
Lifetime (TV network) films
1990s English-language films
Films directed by Joan Tewkesbury
1990s American films